State Route 157 (SR 157) is a  state highway in the northern and northwestern parts of the U.S. state of Alabama. SR 157 continues as Tennessee State Route 227 (SR 227) once it crosses into Tennessee.

Route description
State Route 157 begins at a 4-way stop with US 278. South of the 4-way stop, the road continues as Cullman County Road 719.

Throughout North Cullman, AL-157 is oriented in an east-to-west trajectory, passing by a large Buick/GMC dealership at its junction with U.S. 31, then past several restaurants, and ultimately reaching I-65. In northern Cullman County, the route makes a gradual curve north. The county line with Morgan County is marked in the middle of a steep downgrade/upgrade known as Battleground Mountain for the nearby town of Battleground.

After this descent/ascent, the route winds its way to Danville, where it junctions with CR-55 and CR-41 (Danville Road). It crosses the line into Lawrence County and shortly junctions with SR-36, which leads to Hartselle and Wren.

Eventually, the route reaches Moulton, where it serves as the main north-to-south thoroughfare for the east district of Moulton, which contains most of its restaurants and shops. It eventually junctions with Alabama State Route 24/Corridor V and Alabama State Route 33.

Past this point, the route passes through Hatton and Alabama State Route 101. It eventually reaches the Colbert County line and thence junctions with Alabama State Route 20.

The concurrent routes reach Muscle Shoals, where the route turns north in a concurrency with Alabama State Route 133, losing Alabama State Route 20.

Past this point, the route crosses the Tennessee River and the Lauderdale County line. The route passes through Florence on a freeway directly through town, intersecting with U.S. 72 and U.S. 43, also losing Alabama State Route 133 and gaining Alabama State Route 17 before and at this specific interchange respectively. On the north side of town, the route re-engages in a concurrency with S.R. 133 and now S.R. 17. After a short concurrency, the route drops S.R. 17 and continues west with S.R. 133. Eventually, it turns off of the concurrency and heads north, crossing the Tennessee state line directly beside the Natchez Trace Parkway. The route becomes Tennessee State Route 227, which loops around and acts as the northern terminus to Alabama State Route 101.

This route is an important connector between multiple cities in Northwestern Alabama with S.R. 20, S.R. 24, and S.R. 13.

History
Most of the length of SR 157 was constructed between 1957 and 1962.

In 1969, the route was rerouted in Cullman County onto a new road, from an older two-lane road. This older routing is now discontinuous and impossible to traverse at once without using the new route, compiled of modern-day County Road 1188, County Road 1181, County Road 1174; and (on the east side of Interstate 65) 'Old Highway 157' and St. Joseph Street NW. After that point, S.R. 157 was routed onto the modern-day routing, also a two-lane road. This new routing featured an interchange with Interstate 65 and continued straight to U.S. Route 31. Over the last several years, this routing has been widened and extended to be a continuous four-lane divided highway from U.S. Route 31 to the county line; and now extends all the way to U.S. Route 278 on the east side of the city.

The stretch between SR 36 at Oakville and SR 33 at Moulton was constructed later, between 1967 and 1968.

 SR 157 has been four-laned along almost its entire length. This project, which began in the 1980s, was finally completed in the summer of 2007.

Major intersections

See also

References

External links

157
Transportation in Cullman County, Alabama
Transportation in Lawrence County, Alabama
Transportation in Colbert County, Alabama
Transportation in Lauderdale County, Alabama
Florence–Muscle Shoals metropolitan area
Florence, Alabama
Bypasses in Alabama